Tommaso Stella, O.P. also Domenico Stella (died 1566) was a Roman Catholic prelate who served as Bishop of Capodistria (1549–1566), Bishop of Lavello (1547–1549), and Bishop of Salpi (1544–1547).

Biography
Tommaso Stella was ordained a priest in the Order of Preachers.
On 9 May 1544, he was appointed during the papacy of Pope Paul III as Bishop of Salpi.
On 22 April 1547, he was appointed during the papacy of Pope Paul III as Bishop of Lavello.
On 10 November 1549, he was appointed during the papacy of Pope Paul III as Bishop of Capodistria.
He served as Bishop of Capodistria until his death on 6 January 1566.

References

External links and additional sources
 (for Chronology of Bishops) 
 (for Chronology of Bishops) 
 (Chronology of Bishops) 
 (Chronology of Bishops) 
 (Chronology of Bishops) 
 (Chronology of Bishops) 

16th-century Italian Roman Catholic bishops
Bishops appointed by Pope Paul III
1566 deaths
Dominican bishops